Essentials was a British lifestyle magazine published by IPC Media, part of Time Inc. It is still published in South Africa.

History and profile
Essentials was launched in April 1988 in London, England with its final issue cover dated December 2016. It has several international editions. The French edition of the magazine is published under the name of Avantages.

The circulation of Essentials was 106,648 copies between July and December 2013.

References

External links
Essentials web site
Official IPC Media web site

1988 establishments in the United Kingdom
2016 disestablishments in the United Kingdom
Lifestyle magazines published in the United Kingdom
Monthly magazines published in the United Kingdom
Defunct women's magazines published in the United Kingdom
Magazines published in London
Magazines established in 1988
Magazines disestablished in 2016
Women's fashion magazines